Real Kisumu is an association football club based in Kisumu, Kenya. The team plays its home games at the Moi Stadium.

In 2012, the club was promoted to Kenyan Nationwide League, from the Kenyan Provincial League.

References

External links
Profile

Football clubs in Kenya
Kisumu